Seandre Antonio Richardson (born January 21, 1990) is a former American football safety who previously played for the Green Bay Packers of the National Football League. He was signed by the Packers as an undrafted free agent in 2012. He played college football at Vanderbilt.

College career
He played college football at Vanderbilt.

Richardson was a three-year starter for the Commodores, playing alongside former Packer teammate Casey Hayward. In his three seasons as a starter, he recorded 194 tackles (including 11.5 for loss), one interception, and a fumble recovery for a touchdown.

Professional career
After going undrafted in the 2012 NFL Draft, Richardson signed with the Green Bay Packers on May 11, 2012. He earning a spot on the Packers' 53-man roster in 2012.

Career statistics
Source:

Regular season

Postseason

References

External links
Green Bay Packers bio 
Vanderbilt Commodores bio
Sports-reference.com

1990 births
Living people
People from Linden, Alabama
Players of American football from Alabama
American football safeties
Vanderbilt Commodores football players
Green Bay Packers players